Banapura is a small town in the Hoshangabad District of Madhya Pradesh, India. Banapura is a twin (or sister) city of Seoni Malwa.

Banapura has been culturally a rich part of malwa. It mainly consists of Gound and Bheel tribes. Most part of the constituency is agriculture land. Narmada river and Tawa Reservoir fulfill almost 60–70% water requirement for agricultural purpose apart from monsoon. Banapura is known for highest production of wheat and soybean.

During British era the city was administrated by Thakur family and post independence it became a part of Central Constituency. After the establishment of Madhya Pradesh as a state, Banapura became a part of the Hoshanbabad district.

 India census, Seoni Malwa had a population of 26,195. Males constitute 52% of the population and females 48%. Seoni Malwa has an average literacy rate of 74%, higher than the national average of 59.5%: male literacy is 81%, and female literacy is 67%. In Seoni Malwa, 13% of the population is under 6 years of age.

Schools
 Kendriya Vidyalaya (Central School)
 Government Higher Secondary School
 (Government) Girls' School 
 Jeeva Jyoti School
 Narmada Valley School
 SHRI GYANRATNA ACADEMY 

 College
 Government Kusum Mahavidyalaya

Temples
 Bheelat Dev Mandir - 4KM towards Hoshangabad
 Khedapati Mandir
 Hanuman Mandir at Dudhiyabad

Rivers
 Kandeli

Bridges
 Kandeli river bridge

Ghat or River Banks
 Babri Ghat - 22KM in north-west
 Aawali Ghat - 26KM in north

Banks
 State Bank of India
 State Bank of India(Agriculture Development Branch)
 Punjab National Bank
 Rural Development Bank

Hospitals
 Shanti Nursing Home
 Government Hospital, Seoni Malwa

Near by 
 Pachmarhi 120KM by road via Pipariya

How to Reach

By Bus : 
Banapura and Seoni Malawa both are well connected with Bhopal, Indore, Itarsi, Hoshangabad, Pachmarhi, Harda and Khandwa via private bus services. These buses run from 5 o'clock in the morning till late at night.

 National Highway 12 is approx 60 KM from Banapura and passes through Obedullaganj
 National Highway 69 is 35 KM from Banapura via Hoshangabad
 National Highway 59A is 25 KM from Banapura and passes through Timarni and Harda
 State Highway 15 passes through Banapura
 Distance from Bhopal to Banapura is approximately 120 KM by road via Hoshangabad
 Distance from Hoshangabad to Banapura is approximately 40 KM by road via Dolaria
 Distance from Itarsi to Banapura is approximately 40 KM by road via Dolaria and Jamani
 Distance from Indore to Banapura is approximately 200 KM by road via Harda
 Distance from Harda to Banapura is approximately 45 KM by road via Timarni

Via Itarsi: 
Banapura is located on South-West of Itarsi. 
By Train There are couple of express trains and passenger trains available for Banapura.
By Bus  There are direct bus services for Banapura on a regular frequency operated by local private bus agencies.
By Taxi  Taxi are available for hire which are run by private operators.

Banapura railway station: 
Banapura is well connected with Mumbai, Delhi, Bhopal and Jabalpur via broad gauge train route. Railways station is located at Banapura. This is a station to reach Seoni Malwa also.

References 

Cities and towns in Hoshangabad district
Hoshangabad

bn:সেওনি মালওয়া
bpy:সেওনি মালৱা
it:Seoni Malwa
pt:Seoni Malwa
vi:Seoni Malwa